Julien Gerbi (born October 3, 1985) is a French-Algerian racing car driver.

Career

Debut

Gerbi started driving in karting in 1992, but didn't choose to race, competing only once in Monaco where he won his first competition. He trained many years, before debuting as a test driver in Formula Nissan Junior in 2003 with the GTEC Team.

Sport Prototypes

In 2004, promoted as the new "Draco Target Driver", the Berber driver participated to the Formula X Endurance Series, finishing 4th in the European category. He finished 3rd for his first race in Monza, and poleman for the first ever race held in the brand new Dubai Autodrome. He was crowned 'Best Rookie' at the end of the year. He also tested in British Formula Three for the Promatecme Team.

Formula 3

He only appeared in one race of the Spanish Formula BMW championship in 2005, before jumping into another Formula 3 seat in 2006. Racing for Team Active in the Turkish Formula Three Championship, Gerbi scored three wins and five podiums in eight races, establishing as well the new Izmir track record in May. Competing only half of the championship, his classification was a final 5th position and another rookie title.

US Barber Mazda Series

In 2007 and 2008, the driver from Nice raced in the United States in the Skip Barber Mazda Series. After a 2007 learning season where he finished 10th in the overall championship against 40 other drivers, Gerbi finished 4th in the 2008 edition, with 10 podiums out of 14 races and a win in Virginia. He set the new track record in Lime Rock Park, and has also been included into the 2007 World 100 Future Racing Stars, among drivers such as Lewis Hamilton, Nelson Piquet Jr. or Sebastian Vettel.

Formula Palmer Audi

Gerbi eventually came back to Europe in 2009 following some British Formula 3 testing. He raced in Formula Palmer Audi, during a year marked by many mechanical issues, but eventually took a 1st row at Snetterton’s last race. After having shown himself as the most improved driver of the season, he tested in Formula 3000 and Formula 2 during the winter.

References
Caradisiac : Julien Gerbi en contact avec Lotus F1 -> http://www.caradisiac.com/F1-Julien-Gerbi-en-contact-avec-Lotus-Racing-39108.htm

External links
 Official website
 

1985 births
Living people
Sportspeople from Nice
French people of Algerian-Berber descent
French racing drivers
Turkish Formula Three Championship drivers
Le Mans Cup drivers
Algerian racing drivers